Elämänmeno is a Finnish television series. It aired on Finnish TV in 1978. that aired on Finnish television from 1 November 1978 to 15 November 1978. It was written by Pirkko Saisio, who wrote the novel of that same name that the show was based on, and directed by Åke Lindman.

See also
List of Finnish television series

External links
 

Finnish television shows
1978 Finnish television series debuts
1978 Finnish television series endings
1970s Finnish television series
Yle original programming